Wyomissing Creek is a  tributary of the Schuylkill River in Berks County, Pennsylvania in the United States. Wyomissing Creek joins the Schuylkill River at the boundary of West Reading Borough and the City of Reading, Pennsylvania.

Wyomissing is a name derived from a Native American language purported to mean "place of flats".

See also
List of rivers of Pennsylvania

References

External links
U.S. Geological Survey: PA stream gaging stations

Rivers of Berks County, Pennsylvania
Rivers of Pennsylvania
Tributaries of the Schuylkill River